This is a list of episodes for the eighth season of Everybody Loves Raymond.

Production 

The eighth season was produced HBO Independent Productions, creator Philip Rosenthal's company Where's Lunch, and David Letterman's Worldwide Pants. Ray Romano was paid $40 million to work on the season, or $1.7 million per episode.

Cast

Main 
Ray Romano as Raymond "Ray" Barone
Patricia Heaton as Debra (née Whelan) Barone
Brad Garrett as Robert Barone
Doris Roberts as Marie Barone
Peter Boyle as Francis "Frank" Barone
 Madylin Sweeten as Alexandra "Ally" Barone
Sawyer Sweeten and Sullivan Sweeten as Geoffrey Barone and Michael Barone

Supporting 
 Monica Horan as Amy McDougall/Barone
 Georgia Engel as Pat MacDougall
 Fred Willard as Hank MacDougall
 Chris Elliott as Peter MacDougall
 Andy Kindler as Andy
 Jon Manfrellotti as Gianni 

 Tom McGowan as Bernie Gruenfelder
 Maggie Wheeler as Linda Gruenfelder 
 Katherine Helmond as Lois Whelan 
 Victor Raider-Wexler as Stan
 Len Lesser as Garvin
 Amy Aquino as Peggy

 Alexandra Romano as Molly
 Albert Romano as Albert
 Max Rosenthal as Max
 Debra Mooney as Lee
 Bunny Levine as Hilda
 Norma Michaels as Mrs. Pechi
 Elsa Raven as Mrs. Lopman

Episodes

References

2003 American television seasons
2004 American television seasons
Everybody Loves Raymond seasons